Salvia forreri is a perennial plant that is native to five provinces in Mexico: Coahuila, Durango, Sinaloa, Nuevo-Leon, and Zacateca. It grows at  elevation. According to Carl Epling, it might be a variety of Salvia arizonica rather than a distinct species.

Notes

forreri